Kristol is a surname. Notable people with the surname include:

Bill Kristol (born 1952), American neoconservative pundit
David Kristol (born 1938), chemistry professor
Irving Kristol (1920–2009), American neoconservative
Ljuba Kristol (born 1944), Israeli chess champion

See also

Crystal (disambiguation)
Kristel, given name and surname
Krystal (disambiguation)
Cristal (disambiguation)
Chrystal (disambiguation)